AFM Fakhrul Islam Munshi is a Bangladesh Awami League politician and the former Member of Parliament of Comilla-4.

Career
Munshi was elected to parliament from Comilla-4 as a Jatiya Party candidate in 1986 and 1988. He served as the Minister of Shipping and Finance in cabinet of President Hussain Mohammad Ershad. He joined Awami League after his term ended. He is the President of the Bangladesh Agro Processors Association.

Personal life
Munshi has two sons, Raquib Mohammad Fakhrul (Rocky) and Razee Mohammad Fakhrul, is a member of parliament from Bangladesh Awami League.

References

Awami League politicians
Living people
3rd Jatiya Sangsad members
4th Jatiya Sangsad members
Year of birth missing (living people)